Susan Holloway (born May 19, 1955) is a Canadian retired cross-country skier and sprint canoeist. In 1976, Holloway became the first woman and first Canadian to compete in both the Summer and Winter Olympic Games in the same year, competing in cross-country skiing at the winter games in Innsbruck and in canoe sprint at the summer games in Montreal.

Life and career

Susan Holloway was born in Halifax, Nova Scotia. Her family moved to Ottawa when she was 3. She graduated from Brookfield High School in 1973. She later attended Simon Fraser University in Vancouver where she competed in their swim team and earned a physical education degree in 1983.

In cross-country skiing at the 1976 Winter Games in Innsbruck, she finished 32nd in the 10 km and seventh in the 4 × 5 km relay.

Holloway was selected as Canada's flag bearer for the Opening Ceremonies of the 1980 Summer Olympics in Moscow. However, Canada's boycott of those games denied her the opportunity to participate in the Parade of Nations.

Holloway won two medals in canoe sprint at the 1984 Summer Olympics in Los Angeles with a silver in the K-2 500 m and a bronze in the K-4 500 m events.

Awards and honours
Holloway was inducted into the Canadian Olympic Hall of Fame in 1986. In 1988, the Sue Holloway Fitness Park was built at Mooney's Bay Park in Ottawa. The park was demolished in 2018 and relocated in 2019.

Personal life
In 2002, Holloway married Canadian Olympic high jumper Greg Joy. They have two daughters.

Cross-country skiing results

Olympic Games

References

External links
Collections Canada image 1
Sports-reference.com profile

1955 births
Canadian female canoeists
Canadian female cross-country skiers
Canadian people of Irish descent
Canoeists at the 1976 Summer Olympics
Canoeists at the 1984 Summer Olympics
Cross-country skiers at the 1976 Winter Olympics
Living people
Medalists at the 1984 Summer Olympics
Olympic canoeists of Canada
Olympic cross-country skiers of Canada
Olympic bronze medalists for Canada
Olympic medalists in canoeing
Olympic silver medalists for Canada
Sportspeople from Halifax, Nova Scotia
Simon Fraser University alumni
20th-century Canadian women